The 1991 NBA playoffs was the postseason tournament of the National Basketball Association's 1990–91 season. The tournament concluded with the Eastern Conference champion Chicago Bulls defeating the Western Conference champion Los Angeles Lakers 4 games to 1 in the NBA Finals. Michael Jordan was named NBA Finals MVP.

The Lakers reached the Finals despite not being the top seed in the Western Conference for the first time since 1981, and for just the second time since drafting Magic Johnson first overall in 1979.

After the Pistons had ended their season the last three years, the Bulls got revenge in the Eastern Conference Finals by sweeping the two-time defending NBA champions. It was the first time the Bulls won a playoff series over the Pistons since 1974, when both teams were still part of the Western Conference. Game 4 ended with some of the Pistons walking off the court before time expired, refusing to shake the Bulls' hands. The Pistons were vilified for this. In the 1989 NBA Finals, the Pistons themselves had swept the two-time defending champion Lakers. Detroit did not reach the conference finals again until 2003.

The seventh seeded Golden State Warriors stunned the San Antonio Spurs in the first round of the playoffs, defeating them 3 games to 1. It would be Golden State's last playoff series win until 2007.

The 76ers and the Bucks met in the first round of the playoffs where the 76ers swept the series. It would be both teams last playoff appearance until 1999.

Game 4 of the Blazers–Jazz series was the last game ever played at the Salt Palace.

The Spectrum hosted its final NBA playoff game in Game 4 of the Bulls–76ers series. When the 76ers returned to the playoffs in 1999, they had moved to the CoreStates Center, their home since the 1996–97 season.

This was the first year that NBC aired the NBA Playoffs.

Bracket

First round

Eastern Conference first round

(1) Chicago Bulls vs. (8) New York Knicks

 Michael Jordan's famous dunk on Patrick Ewing.

This was the third playoff meeting between these two teams, with the Bulls winning the first two meetings.

(2) Boston Celtics vs. (7) Indiana Pacers

 Larry Bird came back in the middle of the third quarter despite suffering a concussion in the second and inspired the Celtics' rally.

This was the first playoff meeting between the Celtics and the Pacers.

(3) Detroit Pistons vs. (6) Atlanta Hawks

This was the sixth playoff meeting between these two teams, with the Hawks winning three of the first five meetings.

(4) Milwaukee Bucks vs. (5) Philadelphia 76ers

 Jay Humphries hits three pointer at the buzzer to force OT.

 Adrian Dantley and Jack Sikma's final NBA game.

This was the eighth playoff meeting between these two teams, with the 76ers winning four of the first seven meetings.

Western Conference first round

(1) Portland Trail Blazers vs. (8) Seattle SuperSonics

This was the fourth playoff meeting between these two teams, with the SuperSonics winning two of the first three meetings.

(2) San Antonio Spurs vs. (7) Golden State Warriors

This was the first playoff meeting between the Warriors and the Spurs.

(3) Los Angeles Lakers vs. (6) Houston Rockets

 Byron Scott hits the clutch shot with 15 seconds left.

This was the fourth playoff meeting between these two teams, with the Rockets winning two of the first three meetings.

(4) Phoenix Suns vs. (5) Utah Jazz

This was the third playoff meeting between these two teams, with the Suns winning the first two meetings.

Conference semifinals

Eastern Conference semifinals

(1) Chicago Bulls vs. (5) Philadelphia 76ers

 76ers final playoff game at the Spectrum.

This was the second playoff meeting between these two teams, with the Bulls winning the first meeting.

(2) Boston Celtics vs. (3) Detroit Pistons

This was the sixth playoff meeting between these two teams, with the Celtics winning three of the first five meetings.

Western Conference semifinals

(1) Portland Trail Blazers vs. (5) Utah Jazz

 This was the last game ever played at the Salt Palace.

This was the second playoff meeting between these two teams, with the Jazz winning the first meeting.

(3) Los Angeles Lakers vs. (7) Golden State Warriors

 Sam Perkins hits the game-tying lay-up with 2.4 seconds left to force OT.

This was the seventh playoff meeting between these two teams, with the Lakers winning five of the first six meetings.

Conference finals

Eastern Conference finals

(1) Chicago Bulls vs. (3) Detroit Pistons

 In their last show of defiance, Isiah Thomas, Bill Laimbeer, and Mark Aguirre of the Pistons walked off the court with 7.9 seconds left in Game 4 so as not to congratulate the Bulls. Only Joe Dumars and John Salley shook hands with any of the Bulls.

This was the fifth playoff meeting between these two teams, with the Pistons winning three of the first four meetings.

Western Conference finals

(1) Portland Trail Blazers vs. (3) Los Angeles Lakers

This was the fifth playoff meeting between these two teams, with the Lakers winning three of the first four meetings.

NBA Finals: (E1) Chicago Bulls vs. (W3) Los Angeles Lakers

 Sam Perkins hits the game-winning 3 with 14 seconds left.

 Michael Jordan does "The Move".

 Michael Jordan hits the game-tying shot with 3.4 seconds left to force OT.

This was the fifth playoff meeting between these two teams, with the Lakers winning the first four meetings.

References

External links
 Basketball-Reference's 1991 NBA Playoffs page

National Basketball Association playoffs
Playoffs
GMA Network television specials

fi:NBA-kausi 1990–1991#Pudotuspelit